William Dalrymple (1736 – 16 February 1807) was a Scottish soldier and Member of Parliament (MP) in the British Parliament and Parliament of Ireland. He was the son of the Hon. George Dalrymple, brother of John Dalrymple, 5th Earl of Stair. Father of John Dalrymple, 7th Earl of Stair.

Life
 He was educated at Glasgow University 1749.

In 1752 he joined the British Army, becoming an ensign in the 52nd Regiment of Foot. He became a lieutenant in 1759 and a captain (in the 91st Regiment of Foot) from 1760. By 1762 he was a major, and served in the campaign against the Spanish invasion of Portugal (1762). After a period on half pay in 1763, he was appointed to the 14th Regiment of Foot in 1764. He was promoted to lieutenant colonel in 1765.

Between 1766 and 1768, Dalrymple was in Halifax, Nova Scotia. In 1768, he was placed in command of a detachment of two regiments sent to Boston, Massachusetts, to support embattled royal officials who were having trouble enforcing the unpopular Townshend Acts.  Troops in his command (although he was not directly involved) were involved in the Boston Massacre, in which five civilians were killed when those troops fired into a crowd.  Amid continuing hostility, Dalrymple acceded to the request of Acting Governor Thomas Hutchinson to remove his troops to Castle William, an island fortress in Boston harbour.

In 1772-1773 Dalrymple received a local promotion to major general and commanded a force which captured the West Indian island of St Vincent. He returned to Britain in 1773. He continued to be in touch with his American Loyalist friends in Boston. He was saddened but not surprised by the Boston Tea Party.

After the American War of Independence broke out in 1775, Dalrymple returned to North America. He served as quartermaster general 1779-1783. He was promoted to brigadier general (1779) and then major general (1782).

After the end of the war Dalrymple was attacked for alleged corruption, but General William Howe stoutly defended his former subordinate and the allegations were dropped.

Dalrymple then went into politics. He represented Wigtown Burghs in the British House of Commons from 1784 to 1790. Between 1796 and 1798 he sat for Duleek in the Irish House of Commons.

Dalrymple was promoted to lieutenant general 1793 and general 1798.

Lt. Governor of Royal Hospital Chelsea 22 Mar 1798 to 2 Apr 1804; and 19 Oct. 1804 to his death.

He was Colonel of the 47th (Lancashire) Regiment of Foot from 1794 to his death.

References

History of Parliament: House of Commons 1754-1790, by Sir Lewis Namier and James Brooke (Sidgwick & Jackson 1964)

1736 births
1807 deaths
52nd Regiment of Foot officers
British Army generals
British Army personnel of the American Revolutionary War
Irish MPs 1790–1797
Members of the Parliament of Great Britain for Scottish constituencies
Members of the Parliament of Ireland (pre-1801) for County Meath constituencies
West Yorkshire Regiment officers
British Army personnel of the Seven Years' War
British MPs 1784–1790
Alumni of the University of Glasgow